Colchicum autumnale, commonly known as autumn crocus, meadow saffron, or naked ladies, is a toxic autumn-blooming flowering plant that resembles the true crocuses, but is a member of the plant family Colchicaceae, unlike the true crocuses, which belong to the family Iridaceae. The name "naked ladies" is because the flowers emerge from the ground long before the leaves appear. Despite the vernacular name of "meadow saffron", this plant is not the source of saffron, which is obtained from the saffron crocus, Crocus sativus – and that plant, too, is sometimes called "autumn crocus".

The species is cultivated as an ornamental in temperate areas, in spite of its toxicity. The cultivar 'Nancy Lindsay' has gained the Royal Horticultural Society’s Award of Garden Merit.

Description
At the time of fertilisation, the ovary is below ground.

Distribution
C. autumnale is the only species of its family native to Great Britain and Ireland, with notable populations under the stewardship of the County Wildlife Trusts. It also occurs across mainland Europe from Portugal to Ukraine, and is reportedly naturalised in  Sweden, European Russia, and New Zealand.

Pharmaceutical uses
The bulb-like corms  of C. autumnale contain colchicine, a useful drug with a narrow therapeutic index. Colchicine is approved in many countries for the treatment of gout and familial Mediterranean fever, but has a low therapeutic index.  Colchicine is also used in plant breeding to produce polyploid strains.

Toxicity
Colchicum plants are deadly poisonous due to their colchicine content and have been mistaken by foragers for Allium ursinum (ramsons or wild garlic), which they vaguely resemble.  The symptoms of colchicine poisoning are similar to those of arsenic, and no antidote is known.

This plant (and colchicine itself) poses a particular threat to felines. The leaves and fruit of meadow saffron contain the highest level of toxins, but all parts of the plant are regarded as poisonous.

Gallery

References

Further reading

Autumn Bulbs by Roy Leeds (B.T. Batsford Ltd) 2006 

autumnale
Flora of Europe
Medicinal plants of Europe
Flora of Croatia
Flora of Germany
Flora of Greece
Flora of Ireland
Flora of Italy
Flora of Latvia
Flora of Poland
Flora of Romania
Flora of Spain
Flora of Switzerland
Flora of Ukraine
Flora of the United Kingdom
Plants described in 1753
Taxa named by Carl Linnaeus